The Willow song is an anonymous Elizabethan or earlier folk song used in the penultimate act of Shakespeare's Othello. The earliest record of the Willow song is in a book of lute music from 1583, while Shakespeare's play was not written until 20 years later in 1604. The song in Shakespeare's play is sung by Desdemona, Othello's wife, when she has begun to fear her jealous husband.

Selected recordings
Heroines of Love and Loss, Ruby Hughes BIS – BIS2248
Shakespeare Songs	Deller Consort, Alfred Deller with Desmond Dupré (lute) Harmonia Mundi Musique d'Abord – HMA195202
Songs for Voice and Guitar Wilfred Brown (tenor) John Williams, Sony
Byrd & Dowland: Ye Sacred Muses Jean-Michel Fumas (countertenor) Eliza Consort Ameson – ACSP1122
Shakespeare – Come Again Sweet Love Daniel Taylor (countertenor) Theatre of Early Music RCA – 88697727222
Songs for William Shakespeare  Sara Stowe  (soprano) The Gift of Music – CCLCDG1006
Shakespeare's Englande  Music of his Plays & People  James Griffett  (tenor), Brian Wright (lute) English Consort of Viols, Nicholas McGegan Griffin – GCCD4036
A Distant Mirror  The Folger Consort

References

Works by William Shakespeare
English folk songs
16th-century songs